Georges Chennevière was the pen name of Leon Debille (22 May 1884 in Paris – 21 August 1927 in Paris) a French poet and playwright.

Biography
Georges Chennevière studied at the Lycée Condorcet in Paris, where he met Jules Romains with whom he formed a community of artists called the Abbaye de Créteil beginning in 1905. He was one of the leading poets in the "Unanimism movement". He left a body of poetic work (published by Gallimard and others) and some plays. His Chant de midi (Midday chant) inspired Albert Doyen to compose a body of choral work with organ and orchestra, created in 1919 on the occasion of the Fêtes du Peuple (Celebration of the People). Called to the army in 1914, he served as a soldier then nurse, his experiences at the front fomenting a hatred of war that explained his subsequent commitments. A critic and contributor to magazines such as L'Effort Libre, Les Hommes du Jour, he also participated in the creation of the Clarté movement in 1919 in which he became its secretary. But having closer ties to Romain Rolland than Barbusse, he resigned in June 1919. In July of that year he began writing for L'Humanité where Jules Romains held a literary column. He remained with the paper until the end of 1923, during which he worked as a literary and music critic. Declining to join the French Communist Party, he left the paper for Le Quotidien, a more neutral one.

Selected publications
Poetry
 Le Printemps, Eugène Figuière, 1910
 Appel au Monde, Fêtes du peuple, 1919
 Le Chant de Midi, fête pour la commémoration des morts, A. Leduc, 1919
 Poèmes, 1911-1918, La Maison des Amis du Livre, 1920
 La légende du Roi d'un Jour, NRF - Gallimard, 1927
 Œuvres poétiques, Gallimard, 1929
 Pamir, edition Sagesse, 1933
 Le Cycle des Fêtes, edition Sablier, 1941
Novel
 Le Tour de France, Gallimard, 1929 (first 4 chapters of an unfinished novel)
Theater
 Le Triomphe [unedited, manuscript lost], drama in verse in 5 acts written between 1910 and 1912
 L'impromptu de la Sainte-Cécile [unedited, manuscript lost], comedy in 12 scenes and a prologue, written in 1925
 A.E.I.O.U., Paris, les Humbles, 1931 [published by Louf under the title Deux Farces Inédites]
In collaboration with Jules Romains
 Petit traité de versification, N.R.F., Gallimard, 1923

References

External links
 Site of L'Abbaye de Créteil

20th-century French poets
20th-century French literature
French literature
French male poets
People from Créteil
1884 births
1927 deaths
20th-century French male writers